AFC Fylde Women is an English women's football club affiliated with AFC Fylde and currently playing in the .

History
The club was formed under the name Duke of York in 1971, as founder members of the North West Women's League. They were renamed Preston Rangers W.F.C. in 1977 and reached the semi finals of the FA Women's Cup in 1982–83 and 1989–90.

In 1997, they became Preston North End W.F.C. and finished 1997–98 as champions, winning promotion to the Northern Combination Women's Football League. In 1999, the club was officially affiliated with Preston North End F.C. The club won the Northern Combination Women's Football League in 2005–06 and were promoted into the FA Women's Premier League Northern Division for the first time. In June 2011, Luke Swindlehurst was appointed first team manager, following his previous role as assistant manager in the 2010–11 season.

The club was rebranded Fylde Ladies F.C. in May 2016 after switching its affiliation from Preston North End to AFC Fylde. The name was changed to AFC Fylde Women from the start of the 2019–20 season.

On 28 April 2020, because of the Covid-19 pandemic, the team was disbanded due to growing uncertainties within women's football, and the financial implications of the pandemic. One month later, on 26 May 2020, AFC Fylde reversed its decision, thus saving the club.

Grounds
The team played in Preston when the club was affiliated with Preston North End. In 2016, they moved to Kellamergh Park in the village of Warton, Borough of Fylde. In August 2018, they briefly moved in with their male counterpart team at Mill Farm, training at The Fylde Sports and Education Centre. The club returned to Kellamergh Park a few weeks later.

Players

Former players

Retired numbers

19  Zoe Tynan, Midfielder (2016)

Coaching staff

External links
 Fixtures and Results
 Official website

References

AFC Fylde
1971 establishments in England
FA Women's National League teams
Preston North End F.C.
Sport in the Borough of Fylde
Sport in Preston
Women's football clubs in England